Widad Athletic Tlemcen, known as WA Tlemcen or WAT for short, is an Algerian football club based in Tlemcen. The club was founded in 1962 and its colours are blue and white. Their home stadium, Stade Akid Lotfi, has a capacity of some 18,000 spectators. The club is currently playing in the Algerian Ligue 2.

Honours

Domestic competitions
Algerian Cup
Winners (2): 1997–98, 2001–02
Runners-up (3): 1973–74, 1999–00, 2007–08

Algerian League Cup
Runners-up (1): 1999

Regional competitions
Arab Club Champions Cup
Winners (1): 1998

Performance in CAF competitions
CAF Cup Winners' Cup: 2 appearances
1999 – First Round
2003 – First Round

Players

Current squad

Personnel

Current technical staff

Management

Records
{|class="wikitable"  style="text-align: center;"
|-
!Season!!Div.!!Pos.!!Pl.!!W!!D!!L!!GS!!GA!!GD!!P!!colspan=3|Domestic cup !!colspan=1|CAF!!colspan=1|Other Competitions!!colspan=2|Top scorer!!         Manager
|-
|2009/10
| bgcolor=Gold|ACN||8||34||12||10||12||43||43||0||46
| bgcolor=Silver|AC
| Quarterfinals
| colspan=2|
|
| Ghazali
| 12
|  Fouad Bouali
|-
|2010/11
| bgcolor=Gold|LP1||11||30||10||7||13||35||36||−1||37
| bgcolor=Silver|AC
| Round of 64
| colspan=2|
|
| Boudjakdji
| 7
|  Abdelkader Amrani

|-
|2011/12
| bgcolor=Gold|LP1||8||30||12||8||10||39||37||+2||44
| bgcolor=Silver|AC
| Round of 32

| colspan=2|
|
| Andriamatsinoro
| 10
|  Abdelkader Amrani
|}

Div. = Division; ACN = Algerian Championnat National; LP1 = Algerian Ligue Professionnelle 1; Pos. = Position; Pl = Match played; W = Win; D = Draw; L = Lost
GS = Goal scored; GA = Goal against; GD = Goal difference P = Points
AP = Algerian Cup
ARCL = Arab Champions League; ARWC = Arab Cup Winners' Cup; CAFL = CAF Champions League;CAFCC= CAF Confederation Cup;CAFSC = CAF Super Cup
Colors: Gold = winner; Silver = runner-up; Bronze = third, Semi-final .

Notable players
Below are the notable former players who have represented WA Tlemcen in league and international competition since the club's foundation in 1962. To appear in the section below, a player must have played in at least 100 official matches for the club or represented the national team for which the player is eligible during his stint with WA Tlemcen or following his departure.

For a complete list of WA Tlemcen players, see :Category:WA Tlemcen players

  Reda Acimi
  Cheïkh Benzerga
  Ali Dahleb
  Sofiane Daoud
  Moustapha Djallit
  Lounès Gaouaoui
  Kamel Habri
  Samir Hadjaoui
  Kheireddine Kherris
  Hichem Mezaïr
  Seddik Naïr
  Koh Traoré
  Carolus Andriamatsinoro
  Vorslav Marković

Managers
 Mohamed Henkouche
 Abdelkader Amrani (July 2011 – Oct 12)
 Kheireddine Kherris (interim) (Oct 2012 – Nov 12)
 Abdelkrim Benyellès (Nov 2012 – Jun 2013)

References

External links
Official website

 
Football clubs in Algeria
Association football clubs established in 1962
Wa Tlemcen
Algerian Ligue Professionnelle 1 clubs
1962 establishments in Algeria
Sports clubs in Algeria